Attila Molnár may refer to:
 Attila Molnár (footballer born 1897) (1897–?), Romanian international footballer
 Attila Molnár (footballer born 1974) (born 1974), Hungarian footballer (Zalaegerszegi TE)
 Attila Molnár (politician) (born 1971), Hungarian politician
 Attila Molnar (swimmer), see 1993 European Aquatics Championships